The 1952 Taça de Portugal Final was the final match of the 1951–52 Taça de Portugal, the 12th season of the Taça de Portugal, the premier Portuguese football cup competition organized by the Portuguese Football Federation (FPF). The match was played on 15 June 1952 at the Estádio Nacional in Oeiras, and opposed two Primeira Liga sides: Benfica and Sporting CP. Benfica defeated Sporting CP 5–4 to claim their sixth Taça de Portugal.

Match

Details

References

1952
Taca
S.L. Benfica matches
Sporting CP matches